Danishefsky's diene (Kitahara diene) is an organosilicon compound and a diene with the formal name trans-1-methoxy-3-trimethylsilyloxy-buta-1,3-diene named after Samuel J. Danishefsky. Because the diene is very electron-rich it is a very reactive reagent in Diels-Alder reactions. This diene reacts rapidly with electrophilic alkenes, such as maleic anhydride. The methoxy group promotes highly regioselective additions. The diene is known to react with amines, aldehydes, alkenes and alkynes. Reactions with imines  and nitro-olefins  have been reported.

It was first synthesized by the reaction of trimethylsilyl chloride with 4-methoxy-3-buten-2-one and zinc chloride:

The diene has two features of interest: the substituents promote regiospecific addition to unsymmetrical dienophiles and the resulting adduct is amenable to further functional group manipulations after the addition reaction. High regioselectivity is obtained with unsymmetrical alkenes with a preference for a 1,2-relation of the ether group with the electron-deficient alkene-carbon. All this is exemplified in this aza Diels-Alder reaction:

In the cycloaddition product, the silyl ether is a synthon for a carbonyl group through the enol. The methoxy group is susceptible to an elimination reaction enabling the formation of a new alkene group.

Applications in asymmetric synthesis have been reported. Derivatives have been reported.

References

Conjugated dienes
Trimethylsilyl compounds
Reagents for organic chemistry